is a Japanese former professional footballer who played as a defender.

Career

Youth
Shimazaki spent eight years with the Kawasaki Frontale academy.

College & MLS SuperDraft
Shimazaki opted to move to the United States to play college soccer at Virginia Commonwealth University in 2016, where he played for four years, making a total of 69 appearances, scoring seven goals and tallying six assists for the Rams.

While at college, Shimazaki appeared for USL League Two sides Portland Timbers U23s in 2018, and with Tormenta FC 2 in 2019.

On 13 January 2020, Shimazaki was selected 59th overall in the 2020 MLS SuperDraft by Columbus Crew SC.

Professional
On 16 January 2020, Shimazaki joined New England Revolution II ahead of the 2020 season. He made his professional debut on 25 July 2020, appearing as a half-time substitute against Union Omaha. He scored his first goal on 26 August 2020, scoring the game's only goal in a 1–0 win over Greenville Triumph. Shimazaki's contract option was declined by New England on 30 November 2020.

On 29 August 2021, Shimozaki announced his retirement from professional soccer.

International
Shimazaki has represented Japan at under-16 and under-17 level.

References

External links 
 

1997 births
Living people
Japanese footballers
Japan youth international footballers
Japanese expatriate footballers
Association football defenders
VCU Rams men's soccer players
Portland Timbers U23s players
Tormenta FC players
New England Revolution II players
USL League Two players
USL League One players
Columbus Crew draft picks